Ghamra (also written Rhamra) is a village in the commune of Guemar, in Guemar District, El Oued Province, Algeria.

References

Neighbouring towns and cities

Populated places in El Oued Province